Paul William McDowell (15 August 1931 – 2 May 2016) was an English actor and writer who  appeared in numerous television productions over a 40-year period.

Early life and career
McDowell was born in Fulham, south-west London the only son of William a museum guard and shipyard worker.  His mother Frances was a landlady and cleaner.  He attended several primary schools and was evacuated to Guildford, Rochdale, and Torbay during the second world war. After leaving school, he trained to be a painter at Chelsea Art College. He later attended St Edmund Hall, Oxford. In the early 1960s as "Whispering" Paul McDowell he was a vocalist with the British 1920s-style jazz band The Temperance Seven, who had a No. 1 hit in Britain. He was a member of the pop group 'Guggenheim' which he formed with Granada Television producer and singer Chris Pye, and guitarist Jules Burns.  The album Guggenheim was released in 1972 on Indigo Records, and distributed by the British Decca label.  He worked at the Establishment Club as an actor/writer, then became a member of the improvisational group the Second City in the United States and was a writer on The Frost Report.

Television actor
His television roles include: Mr Collinson, a sour-faced prison officer in Porridge, Churchill's butler in Winston Churchill: The Wilderness Years, and  Mr Phillips in The Two of Us.

Writer
As a screenwriter he wrote for Sheila Hancock and The Two Ronnies. Later he concentrated on writing and teaching t'ai chi ch'uan.

Later life
Later he lived in Towcester Northamptonshire, where he wrote a letter  to The Guardian, published on 11 March 2016, less than two months before his death.  His letter was an amusing mild rebuke that The Guardian had omitted to state in their obituary of George Martin that his very first Number 1 hit was the Temperance Seven's "You're Driving Me Crazy".

Illness and Death
On April 23, 2016, McDowell Announced he had been diagnosed with Lung Cancer, He died on May 2, 2016, from complications heart failure following Pneumonia. The immediate cause of death on his death certificate was Cardiac arrest with Respiratory failure.  His children Helena, Lola, Sidonie, Milo and his third wife, Trisha survive him.

Filmography

Film

Television

Notes

External links
 

1931 births
2016 deaths
Alumni of St Edmund Hall, Oxford
English male film actors
English male television actors
Male actors from London